John Middleton may refer to:

Politicians
John Middleton (c.1373–1441), MP for Northumberland
John Middleton (MP for Horsham) (died 1636), English landowner and politician
John Middleton (1671–1745), Member for Bramber and Horsham
John Middleton (British Army officer) (1678–1739), Brigadier-General, Member for Aberdeen
John Myddelton (1685–1747), MP for Denbigh Boroughs 1733–1741 and Denbighshire 1741–1742
Sir John Middleton (colonial administrator) (1870–1954), British colonial administrator

Sportsmen
John Middleton (baseball) (1900–1986), American baseball player
John Middleton (cyclist) (1906–1991), British racing cyclist
John Middleton (footballer, born 1910) (1910–1971), English football player for Swansea Town, Darlington, Blackpool and Norwich City
John Middleton (footballer, born 1955), English football player for Bradford City and Macclesfield
John Middleton (footballer, born 1956) (1956–2016), English football player for Nottingham Forest and Derby County
John Middleton (cricketer) (1890–1966), English cricketer
John R. Middleton, American football player and coach

Other people
John Middleton (giant) (1578–1623), 2.8m tall man from Hale, England
John Middleton (explorer), travelled to the East Indies with James Lancaster, 1601–1603
John Middleton, 1st Earl of Middleton (1608–1674), general in the Battle of Cropredy Bridge during the English Civil War
John Izard Middleton (1785–1849), American archeologist and artist
John Middleton (architect) (1820–1885), English architect
John Middleton (artist), Northern Irish artist, see The Honest Ulsterman
John Henry Middleton (1846–1896), archaeologist and museum director
John Middleton (cowboy) (1854–1885), member of the Regulators alongside Billy the Kid during the Lincoln County War
John Francis Marchment Middleton (1921–2009), British anthropologist
John Middleton (actor) (born 1953), English actor
John Powers Middleton (born 1984), American film and television producer
John S. Middleton, American businessman and philanthropist
John Middleton (Norfolk artist) (1827–1856), English artist
John Middleton (Commentator)(born 1977), English Commentator, Radio Presenter, Producer and Podcaster

Other uses
John Middleton Co., a tobacco manufacturer and subsidiary of Altria

Middleton, John